Friends and Heroes is a Canadian Christian children's program that airs on TBN, Smile of a Child TV, and was also shown on BBC TV.  The show is both traditionally animated (for the adventure story) and computer animated (for the Bible stories). It takes place from 69–71 AD, during the First Jewish–Roman War. There are three seasons or "series", each comprising 13 episodes: Season 1 is set in Alexandria, Egypt; Season 2 in Jerusalem and Season 3 in Rome. The series was created by Brian D. Brown and Eric J. Danenberg, who also worked on The Storykeepers. Starting with the second season, the show is produced in HD.
All three series have now been translated and dubbed into Arabic, Chinese (both Mandarin, and Taiwan Mandarin), French, German, Hindi, Korean, Brazilian Portuguese, Russian, North American Spanish, and Manx Gaelic. Gary Kurtz, the producer for season one, also produced American Graffiti, Star Wars, and The Empire Strikes Back.

It was also broadcast on the Australian Christian Channel in Australia.

Format overview
The show starts with a recap of last week's episode, relevant or not.  Then the theme song plays.  Act 1 begins with the name of the episode.  There's usually about ten minutes of story and then a Bible story, followed by Act 2.  There's more story and then another Bible story.  Unless it is a two-part episode, the problem is resolved after the second Bible story. There are, however, three Bible stories in one episode.

Story

Alexandria (AD 69)
The series begins in the year 69 AD, in Alexandria. There is a rebellion going on in nearby Judea by the Jews and Christians. In response, the governor, Tiberius orders his men, led by Brutacus and Tobias, to crack down on the Jews and Christians.

In the first episode introduces the family of Samuel, Diana, their son Macky, and their rarely seen parrot, Pontius, who live in Delta Quarter on the port of Alexandria. They are rebels who hide other rebels in their house.  Samuel's friend, a commander for the rebels in Judea, sends his daughters, Leah and Rebecca, to live with Samuel's family.

In episode two, Macky and Rebecca have an encounter with a girl named Portia while riding horses. After talking, they find out that she is the Governor's niece. She becomes fast friends with Samuel's family, but they never tell her that they are rebels.

Episode three introduces the characters of Miriam and Nathan, Samuel and Diana's friends, as well as fellow rebels. We are also introduced to their adopted African son, Sollie.

The entire first season is primarily a series of journeys, trying to protect rebels without the Governor or his cronies finding out. In the third-to-last episode, however, Tobias finds out the truth and they are all forced to flee Alexandria.

Jerusalem (AD 70)
Macky and Portia arrive in Jerusalem during the Roman siege. The people inside are starving, whilst the Romans
grow desperate to break through the city walls.

Outside the city, Macky makes several key acquaintances.  One is Isaac, who pretends to be senile most of the time, but is actually an active member of the rebel underground. His house, filled with hidden rooms and secret passages, is a safe house for the oppressed. Here Macky links up with the rebels (zealots) who live inside Jerusalem and soon becomes a courier between Jerusalem and the outside world.

Inside Jerusalem, Macky meets a girl, Sarah. Macky is drawn to Sarah's idealism, which puts a strain on his relationship with Portia. He also meets a Roman officer named Lucius, widowed father of two young children and secretly a Friend of Jesus – he was one of Paul's guards, many years earlier in Rome.

Macky learns to trust Lucius and he becomes a valued secret ally as Macky faces two old adversaries from Alexandria: Tobias and Brutacus.  Towards the end of the siege, Macky takes greater and greater risks, and is finally captured by the Romans.

Portia tries to intervene, but can’t get him released. Instead she ensures that Macky is sent to Rome, her next destination, and his only hope.

Rome (AD 71)
Arriving in Rome,  Macky finds himself in a gladiator school for the Circus Maximus, where the only rule is kill or be killed. Macky wants to do neither, so Portia intervenes with a Senator, Antonius, who takes Macky as a slave.

Macky discovers that Antonius is a secret Friend of Jesus and that at night, he dons a mask and goes out and rescues fellow Friends of Jesus from jail or helps them escape from slave-masters. Soon Macky in a disguise of his own starts helping the Senator.

Antonius has an enemy in the Senate – Marcus, who blames all the Empire's woes on the Friends of Jesus. Marcus would like to prove the notorious masked rebel is actually his enemy, Antonius. But Antonius is too clever for him. Marcus enlists the help of Tiberius, Brutacus, Tobias and Tobias’ mother Luciana, an expert manipulator and political in-fighter with friends in high places.

Marcus begins to tighten his grip on Macky and Antonius, and Macky's and Portia's relationship deepens and matures through the difficult choices they have to make.

Voice cast

Main
Len Carlson (season 1) and Adam James (seasons 2–3) – Narrator
Austin Di Iulio – Macky
Sarah Gadon – Portia
Cedric Smith – Tiberius
Tony Daniels – Tobias
Howard Jerome – Brutacus
Jamie Watson – Pontius
Benedict Campbell – Samuel
Alyson Court – Diana
Bailey Stocker – Rebecca
Emma Pustil – Leah

Recurring

A.J. Saudin – Sollie
Diane Fabian – Miriam
John Stocker – Nathan
Aaryn Doyle – Flore
Scott Beaudin – Anthony
John Ralston – Lucius/Elijah/Jonah
Philip Akin – Isaac/John Ralston
Martha MacIsaac – Sarah
Alison Sealy-Smith – Devorah
Tim Hamaguchi – Abe
Vanessa Thompson – Rachel
Robert Bockstael – Senator Antonius/Masked Rebel
Elizabeth Hanna – Luciana
Scott McCord – Dudemus
Paul O'Sullivan – Marcus
Lyon Smith – Absolom
Jordan Todosey – Sophia
David Keeley – Amikam
Juan Chioran – Peter/Pompano/2nd Judean Rebel/Fisherman #2
Martin Roach – Jesus/God/1st Judean Rebel
Robert Norman Smith – Aischros/2nd Guard/Judah/Pharaoh/King Xerxes
Shauna MacDonald – Jezebel/Lydia/Naomi
Lawrence Bayne – Caleb
Stephen Bogaert – Aaron
Tony Fleury – Courtier/Thomas
Adrian Truss – Courtier 1+2/Joseph/Supervisor
John Neville – Claxus
Ruth Marshall – Delilah/Eza
Mitchell Eisner – Caius
Kristina Nicoll – Esther/Ruth
Marty Moreau – Spy 2
Ron Rubin – Soldier
Olive French – King David
Peter Oldring – Young David
Larry Byrne – Ahab

Episodes

Series overview

Series 1 (2007)

Series 2 (2008)

Series 3 (2008–09)

Reception
The program was shown in BBC TV in 2007, and since then is available on DVD with accompanying school and Sunday school lessons. It is hailed as "The Best Youth/Children's Programme of 2007" by the UK's Religious Broadcasting Council.

References

External links
 USA & Canada official site
 Kids' site
 UK official site
 IMDb Page
 TV.com Page

2000s Canadian animated television series
2000s Canadian anthology television series
2007 Canadian television series debuts
2009 Canadian television series endings
Canadian children's animated anthology television series
Canadian children's animated education television series
Christian animation
Christian children's television series
English-language television shows
Television series based on the Bible